Ramsden is a surname, and may refer to:

Anne Ramsden, Canadian artist
Barney Ramsden (1917–1990), English footballer
Charlie Ramsden (1904–1975), English footballer
Dave Ramsden (born 1964), British civil servant
Denise Ramsden (athlete), English Olympian sprint athlete of the 1960s and 1970s
Ernest Ramsden, English footballer
Eugene Ramsden, 1st Baron Ramsden (1883–1955), English politician
Gary Ramsden (born 1983), English cricketer
George Taylor Ramsden (1879–1936), British politician
Harry Ramsden (1888–1963), English businessman, founder of restaurant chain Harry Ramsden's
Horace Edward Ramsden (1878–1948), South African Victoria Cross recipient
J. George Ramsden (1867–1946), Canadian politician
James Ramsden (disambiguation), multiple people
Jesse Ramsden (1735–1800), English astronomical and scientific instrument maker
John Ramsden (disambiguation), multiple people
Mark Ramsden (born 1956), British musician
Marvin Lee Ramsden (1919–1942), US Medal of Honor recipient
Mary Ramsden (born 1984), British painter
 (1947–2016), Australian painter
Omar Ramsden (1873–1939), English silversmith
Peter Ramsden (1934–2002), English rugby league footballer
Peter Ramsden (bishop) (born 1951), Anglican bishop in Papua New Guinea
Simon Ramsden (born 1981), English footballer
Walter Ramsden (1868–1947), English biochemist and physiologist
William Havelock Ramsden (1888–1969), British Army officer

See also
Ramsden (disambiguation)
Ramsden Baronets
Edward Ramsden Hall
Henry Ramsden Bramley